Hasan Heydar (also Romanized as Ḩasan Ḩeydar) is a village in Ahudasht Rural District, Shavur District, Shush County, Khuzestan Province, Iran. At the 2006 census, its population was 179, in 33 families.

References 

Populated places in Shush County